The free online encyclopedia Wikipedia was briefly blocked in Russia in August 2015. Some articles of Wikipedia were included into various censorship lists disseminated by the government. Further threats to block were made following the 2022 Russian invasion of Ukraine.

2015 blocking
On July 28, 2012, President of Russia Vladimir Putin signed Federal Law No. 139-FZ "On Amending the Federal Law on the Protection of Children from Information Harmful to their Health and Development and certain legislative acts of the Russian Federation." This law introduced a number of provisions involving the blocking of Internet sites on the blacklist system and prohibited Internet resources. A number of experts expressed concerns that this law could be used to enable internet censorship.

On November 1, 2012, the provisions concerning a unified register of domain names and URLs containing prohibited information came into force. A Unified Register of Prohibited Sites was created.

Within three years of the adoption of the law, more than 25 Russian Wikipedia articles, mainly about drugs and suicide, entered the Unified Register of Prohibited Sites. Most of these articles, after some time, were removed from the register. However, on August 24, 2015, there was a short blocking of Wikipedia in Russia.

2022 threat to block 

On March 1, 2022, Roskomnadzor, the Russian agency for monitoring and censoring mass media, wrote to the Wikimedia Foundation asking for removal of the article "" ("Russia's invasion of Ukraine (2022)") on the United States-hosted Russian Wikipedia. The agency threatened to block access to the site, claiming that the article contained "illegally distributed information" including "reports about numerous casualties among service personnel of the Russian Federation and also the civilian population of Ukraine, including children".

On March 11, 2022, a Russian Wikipedia editor based in Minsk, Mark Bernstein, was detained by the Belarusian security service GUBOPiK after he was accused online of violating the 2022 Russian fake news law for his edits on articles covering the 2022 Russian invasion of Ukraine.

On March 16, 2022, the Russian Agency of Legal and Judicial Information (news agency founded by the RIA Novosti, the Constitutional Court of Russia, the Supreme Court of Russia, and the Supreme Court of Arbitration of Russia in 2009) published an interview of Alexander Malkevich, the deputy chairman of the commission on the development of information society, media and mass communications of the Civic Chamber of the Russian Federation. In this interview, Malkevich said that Wikipedia (both Russian and others) was becoming a "bridgehead for informational war against Russia". He also stated that Russian law-enforcement agencies had identified thirteen persons who were carrying out "politically engaged editing" Wikipedia's articles, and about 30,000 bloggers "participating in informational war against Russia".

According to Novaya Gazeta, pro-Kremlin structures related to Yevgeny Prigozhin are actively involved in doxing "coordinators of an informational attack on Russia", including Wikipedia editors. Novaya Gazeta also reports that Special Communications Service of Russia (a division of the Federal Protective Service) employees are trying to disseminate pro-Kremlin propaganda by editing Wikipedia articles.

On May 18, 2022, Roskomnadzor demanded to remove articles about the 2022 Russian invasion of Ukraine and the term "Rashism" from the English Wikipedia.

On March 31, 2022, Russian media censorship agency Roskomnadzor threatened to fine Wikimedia up to 4 million rubles (about ) if it did not delete information about the 2022 Russian invasion of Ukraine that is "misinforming" Russians.

In April–May 2022, the Russian authorities put several Wikipedia articles on their list of forbidden sites. The list included the articles 2022 Russian invasion of Ukraine, Rashism, several articles in Russian Wikipedia devoted to the military action and war crimes during the Russo-Ukrainian War, and two sections of the Russian article about Vladimir Putin.

On July 20, due to the refusal of Wikipedia to remove the articles about the Russian-Ukrainian war, Roskomnadzor ordered search engines to mark Wikipedia as a violator of Russian laws.

See also
 Detention of Pavel Pernikaŭ
Blocking of Telegram in Russia
Censorship of Wikipedia
Pierre-sur-Haute military radio station

References

External links
"Russian invasion of Ukraine (2022)" - ru.wikipedia page (Google Translate)

Russia
Internet censorship in Russia
August 2015 events in Russia
March 2022 events in Russia
Reactions to the 2022 Russian invasion of Ukraine